Danio htamanthinus is a small species of ray finned freshwater fish from the family Cyprinidae, the carps and minnows, which was described in 2016 from small streams in the area of Htamanthi on the middle Chindwin River in Myanmar. It is most similar to D. choprae and D. flagrans from the Irrawaddy River drainage.

References

Danio
Fish described in 2016